Amerigo Armando Gilberto Govi (22 October 1885 – 28 April 1966) was an Italian film and stage actor and screenwriter. He was the founder of the Genoese Dialectal Theatre. 

Also famous in Italy, especially Genoa and Liguria, are Quello bonanima ("The one who had a  good soul"), Gildo Peragallo, ingegnere ("Gildo Peragallo, engineer"), I Gustavino e i Passalacqua ("The Gustavinos and the Passalacquas") and Sotto a chi tocca ("Who's next?").

References

Sources

 

1885 births
1966 deaths
Film people from Genoa
Italian male actors
Actors from Genoa